The Republic of Fiji Military Forces (RFMF, formerly the Royal Fiji Military Forces) is the military force of the Pacific island nation of Fiji. With a total manpower of about 4,000 active soldiers and approximately 6,000 reservists, it is one of the smallest militaries in the world. The Ground Force is organised into six infantry and one engineer battalions.

The first two regular battalions of the Fiji Infantry Regiment are traditionally stationed overseas on peacekeeping duties; the 1st Battalion has been posted to Lebanon, Iraq, Syria, and East Timor under the command of the UN, while the 2nd Battalion is stationed in Sinai with the MFO. Peacekeepers income represents an important source of income for Fiji. The 3rd Battalion is stationed in the capital, Suva, and the remaining three are spread throughout the islands.

Organisation 
 Commander-in-Chief – The President of the Republic is ex officio Commander-in-Chief of the Military Forces.
 Commander RFMF – The Commander RFMF is of two-star rank. He is assisted by the Deputy Commander and the Chief of Staff, who are responsible for Strategic Command and Land Force Command. The current Commander is Major General Jone Kalouniwai who was preceded by Rear Admiral Viliame Naupoto who was appointed following the resignation of Brigadier Mosese Tikoitoga on 2 August 2015. Tikoitoga succeeded the previous Commander and current Head of Government Commodore Voreqe (Frank) Bainimarama after fifteen years of service as Commander and a total of thirty-nine years of active military service.
 Strategic Command – Strategic Command is responsible for all of the long term and strategic concerns of the RFMF, including welfare, legal issues, sustainability issues etc.
 Land Force Command – Land Force Command is the operational organisation of the RFMF, and is responsible for all of the main units:
 HQ Land Force Commander Lieutenant Colonel Jone Kalouniwai
 Naval Unit
 Fiji Infantry Regiment
 Regular Force
 1st Battalion
 2nd Battalion
 3rd Battalion
 Territorial Force
 4th Battalion
 5th Battalion
 7th/8th Battalion
 Fiji Engineer Regiment
 Logistic Support Unit
 Force Training Group
 Presidential Palace Guards 
 Fiji Military Forces Band

Equipment 
 AK-101
 RPK-201
 PKM
 RPG-7W
 RPO-A
 M16A2 rifle
 Daewoo K2 rifle
 CAR-15 carbine
 6 x 105 mm KH178 howitzer
 12 x mortar F2 (L16) 81 mm
 Daewoo K3 light machine gun
 M60 Machine Gun
 Bush Master LAH – * Mobile Mechanical Workshop – on Ural-4320 chassis
 10 x refurbished Bushmaster Protected Mobility Vehicle

Fiji Infantry Regiment
The Fiji Infantry Regiment is the main combat element of the Republic of Fiji Military Forces. The regiment was formed with the foundation of the Fijian armed forces in 1920. The regiment, as it is today, goes back to 1978 following Fiji's independence.

Fijian Navy 

The Republic of Fiji Navy was formed in 1975, following the government's ratification of the United Nations Law of the Sea convention.  The Navy is responsible for maritime needs in border control, such as watching over Fiji's exclusive economic zone and organising task and rescue missions.  It currently operates 9 patrol boats. Military aid is received from Australia, the People's Republic of China, and the United Kingdom (although the latter has suspended aid as a result of the 2006 military coup against the civilian government).

Speaking at 30th anniversary celebrations on 26 July 2006, Commander Bradley Bower said that the greatest challenge facing the navy of a maritime country like Fiji was to maintain sovereignty and the maritime environment, to acquire, restore, and replace equipment, and to train officers to keep pace with changing situations.

In January 2019 five of Fiji's naval vessels were operational. In 2020 Australia will provide two new s to replace the three vessels it provided over thirty years ago. The Guardian class patrol vessel  was officially handed over to Fijian officials, in Henderson, Australia, on 6 March 2020.

Northern Air operates search and rescue flights for the Navy.

Equipment

3 x  (Australia, displacement 162 t, length , width  draught , power 2 x , maximal speed , crew 17-man, armament machine guns 1 x 12.7 mm). These boats replaced discharged s FNS Kula, Kikau and Kiro, gained 1975 – 1976 from the United States Navy.
  (May 1994)
  (May 1995)
  (October 1995)
2 patrol boat (US, displacement 97 t, crew 11-man, armament machine guns 1 x 12.7 mm)
  (1987)
  (1987)
4  (Israel, displacement 39 t, crew 9-man, armament 2 x cannon 20 mm, 2 x machine guns 7.62 mm)
  (1991)
  (1991)
  (1991)
  (1991)
2 Oceanic survey vessels

Rank insignia 
Rank designation based on the British tradition.

Commissioned officers
The rank insignia for commissioned officers for the army and navy respectively. They are based on the rank structure of Royal Navy and British Army.

Enlisted
The rank insignia for enlisted personnel for the army and navy respectively. They are based on the ranks of the Royal Navy and British Army.

History

Political intervention 
Fiji's military has a history of political intervention. In 1987, soldiers were responsible for two military coups, and in 2000, the military organised a countercoup to quash George Speight's civilian coup.  Since 2000, the military has had a sometimes tense relationship with the Qarase government, and has strongly opposed its plans to establish a Commission with the power to compensate victims and pardon perpetrators of the coup.  Among other objections, the military claims that its integrity and discipline would be undermined if soldiers who mutinied in the 2000 upheaval were to be pardoned.

On 4 August 2005, Opposition Leader Mahendra Chaudhry called for more Indo-Fijians, who presently comprise less than one percent of the military personnel, to be recruited. (Specifically, as of October 2007, Fiji's military had 3527 full-time members, of whom only 15 were Indo-Fijians.) This would help guarantee political stability, he considered.  He also spoke against government plans to downsize the military.  Military spokesman Lieutenant Colonel Orisi Rabukawaqa responded the next day by saying that the military was not an ethnic Fijian body, that it stood to serve the entire nation, and that there was no colour bar in its recruitment or promotion.  He said that many Indo-Fijians had been reluctant to commit themselves to a military career because of the slow progress of promotion, often preferring to be discharged and to use their record as a stepping stone to a successful career in some other field.  Nevertheless, he appreciated the Indo-Fijian contribution to the military, and noted the success of Lieutenant Colonel Mohammed Aziz, the head of the military's legal unit who was a pivotal figure in the court martial of soldiers who mutinied in 2000. Ironically the rate of promotion of indigenous Fijian officers had been very rapid after the 1987 coup, and subsequent expansion of the Republic of Fiji Military Forces.

On 26 August 2005, the government announced plans to study ways to reduce the size of the military.  Military engineers would be transferred to the Regional Development Ministry, said Home Affair Minister Josefa Vosanibola, and the reduction of the military forces would coincide with an increase in the numbers of the police force.

On 26 September 2005, Rabukawaqa revealed that the military had decided to curtail certain operations to stay within its budget.  The cuts would affect maritime patrols, search and rescue operations, training and exercises, School Cadet training, and the deployment of military engineers to rural areas.  These cuts would be made to ensure that activities accorded a higher priority, such as peacekeeping operations in the Sinai Peninsula and Iraq, officer cadet training with the New Zealand Defence Forces, and the prosecution of soldiers charged with mutiny, would not be affected, Rabukawaqa said.

The next day, Lesi Korovavala, chief executive officer of the Ministry of Home Affairs, told the Fiji Village news service that the military had undertaken the reductions on its own initiative, in consultation with the department, an explanation corroborated by Lieutenant Colonel Rabukawaqa.

On 5 December 2006, the Fijian army staged a third coup d'état. On 7 February 2008, the head of the RFMF and post-coup interim Prime Minister Voreqe Bainimarama stated: "Qarase [...] does not understand the role of the Military and as such is misinforming the nation. [...] [I]f there are practices and policies which have potential to undermine the national security and territorial integrity of Fiji, the RFMF has every right under the Constitution to intervene." In August 2009, with Bainimarama still controlling the government as prime minister and the constitution abrogated, Epeli Nailatikau, a former military commander, was appointed acting president on the retirement of Iloilo.

Operations

Fiji committed troops to the United Nations Assistance Mission for Iraq. Australia agreed to transport those troops.

Fiji sent 54 individuals to Australia, to help fight wildfires there.

Fiji Air Wing 
The Air Wing of the Republic of Fiji Military Forces, founded in 1987, had a base at the airport in Nausori, but was abolished in 1997. Yehonatan Shimʻon Frenḳel writes that the "Air Wing was formed after the 1987 coup, when the French provided two helicopters as part of its military aid package." Frenkel goes on to say that the air wing was disbanded after both helicopters crashed and after subsequent revelations of huge debts incurred as a result of the aircraft.

Aircraft 
The two helicopters were:

Helicopter AS-365 N2 Dauphin crashed off the coast of the main island in July 1994; a smaller AS-355F-2 continued in service until mid-1997 and in 1999 was sold to France.

The Air Wing did not have its own roundel or ensign and its only marking was the national flag used as a fin flash.

Facilities
 Queen Elizabeth Barracks, Suva
 Walu Bay Naval Base – Located at Narain Jetty in Suva Bay and to be relocated outside of Suva

See also
 Military–church relations in Fiji

Notes

References

 
 
 New artillery guns to replace old weapons – Fiji Times Online  (purchase of 105 mm howitzers replacing the pounders)

External links
 Official RFMF website

 
Fiji
Fiji
Fiji
Fiji